Tomorrow's Shore is an EP by British rock band Ride, released on 16 February 2018. The EP consists of tracks from the recordings for the band's 2017 comeback album, Weather Diaries.

The EP was produced by Erol Alkan, who produced Weather Diaries, and was mixed by long-time collaborator Alan Moulder. The EP was released by the label Wichita Records.

Track listing 

 "Pulsar"
 "Keep It Surreal"
 "Cold Water People"
 "Catch You Dreaming"

References 

Wichita Recordings EPs
Albums produced by Erol Alkan